Wide boy is a British term for a man who lives by his wits, wheeling and dealing.

Wide Boy may refer to:

Film

Wide Boy (film), a 1952 British crime film directed by Ken Hughes

Music

"Wide Boy" (song), a 1985 single by English musician Nik Kershaw
"Wide Boy", a 1980 single by English duo Godley & Creme
Wideboys, an English UK garage/house production team
Wide Boy Awake, an English new wave duo, active 1982–1984

Other uses
Wide Boy, the predecessor to the Super Game Boy which played Game Boy games on a Famicom or NES.
Wide-Boy 64, an adapter accessory for the Nintendo 64 video game console that played Game Boy games